Acanthopteroctetidae is a small family of primitive moths with two described genera, Acanthopteroctetes and Catapterix, and a total of seven described species. They are known as the archaic sun moths.

As of 2002, the Acanthopteroctetidae were classified as sole family in superfamily Acanthopteroctetoidea and infraorder Acanthoctesia. Based on more recent research, they may instead be included (alongside the Neopseustidae and the Aenigmatineidae) in superfamily Neopseustoidea.

Morphology
Moths in this superfamily are usually small (but one is 15 mm. in wingspan) and iridescent. Like other "homoneurous" Coelolepida and non-ditrysian Heteroneura, the ocelli are lost. There are a variety of unique structural characteristics, and are evolutionary distinctive. The female adults of both Catapterix crimaea and C. tianshanica are unknown.

Diversity and distribution
Four of the species of type genus Acanthopteroctetes (A. aurulenta, A. bimaculata, A. tripunctata and A. unifascia) are very localised in Western North America, while its fifth species (A. nepticuloides) was described from South Africa. Genus Catapterix has two species, of which Catapterix crimaea has been observed in Crimea and southern France, while Catapterix tianshanica is known from Kyrgyzstan.

In addition, two taxa are known to exist but have so far not been formally described: one from the Andes in Peru, and one from China.

Taxonomy
Around the start of the century, they were considered the fifth group up on the comb of branching events in the extant lepidopteran phylogeny, and also deemed to represent the most basal lineage in the lepidopteran group Coelolepida (along with Lophocoronoidea and the massive group "Myoglossata") characterised in part by its scale morphology.

Research on the molecular phylogeny of the Lepidoptera since then has indicated a close relation between the Acanthopteroctetidae, the Neopseustidae and the Aenigmatineidae, and the three may be considered part of a single superfamily Neopseustoidea rather than three separate, monobasic superfamilies. Molecular data from the same research showed weak support for the clade Coelolepida, and weakly contradicted the placement of Acanthopteroctetidae as most basal lineage of the Coelolepida.

Genus Catapterix was originally described within its own family, Catapterigidae, which is considered a junior synonym of Acanthopteroctidae, with which it shares specialised structural features including similar wing morphology (in A. unifascia).

Biology
Data on the species in Acanthopteroctetidae are scarce. Of the seven described species, only Acanthopteroctetes unifascia has a full description of the larval stage available. Other than a single record of a specimen tentatively identified as Acanthopteroctetes bimaculata, the larvae of the remaining species in both genera are unknown. 

Acanthopteroctetes unifascia larvae are leaf-miners on the shrub genus Ceanothus (Rhamnaceae). They form blotch-shaped mines and overwinter as larva, after which feeding continues in spring. Pupation occurs in a cocoon on the ground. The adult moths emerge during spring and are diurnal.

The specimen tentatively identified as Acanthopteroctetes bimaculata was recorded from a leaf mine on a Ribes sp. (Grossulariaceae).

Conservation
, none of the species in Acanthopteroctetidae have been evaluated by the IUCN.

Footnotes and references

Further reading
 Firefly Encyclopedia of Insects and Spiders, edited by Christopher O'Toole, 2002

External links

 Tree of Life
 Fauna Europaea
 pdf Review of Acanthopteroctetes
 California Moth Specimens Database
 Lepidoptera, Zootaxa

Moth families
Acanthoctesia
Coelolepida